Bernard Austin Snyder (August 25, 1913 – April 15, 1999), was a Major League Baseball second baseman and shortstop who played in  with the Philadelphia Athletics. He batted and threw right-handed. Snyder had a .344 batting average in 10 games, 11 hits in 32 at-bats, in his one-year career.

He was born in Philadelphia, and died in Havertown, Pennsylvania.

External links

1913 births
1999 deaths
Major League Baseball second basemen
Baseball players from Pennsylvania
Philadelphia Athletics players